Carpopenaeus is an extinct genus of prawn, which existed during the Upper Jurassic and Cretaceous periods. It contains three species.

References

Dendrobranchiata
Late Cretaceous crustaceans
Late Jurassic crustaceans
Late Cretaceous extinctions
Tithonian genera
Berriasian genera
Valanginian genera
Hauterivian genera
Barremian genera
Aptian genera
Albian genera
Cenomanian genera
Late Jurassic first appearances
Mesozoic arthropods of Asia
Fossil taxa described in 1946
Early Cretaceous crustaceans